Fulfillment or fulfilment (see spelling differences) may refer to:

Personal
 Self-fulfillment, satisfaction or happiness as a result of fully developing one's abilities or character
 Wish fulfillment, the gratification of desire, especially in dreams, daydreams, etc.

Buildings
 Fulfillment Amphitheater, an outdoor amphitheatre in Taiwan

Business
 Fulfillment house, a type of company that specializes in order fulfillment
 Order fulfillment, the activities performed once an order is received
 Service fulfillment, the process of providing services to telecommunication subscribers

Books
 Fulfillment (book), a 2021 book by Alec MacGillis